George Edward Mansell Heath (20 February 1913 – 6 March 1994) was an English first-class cricketer. A right-handed batsman who bowled right-arm fast-medium, he made his first-class debut for Hampshire in the 1937 County Championship against Essex.

Heath represented Hampshire in 132 first-class matches from 1937 to 1939, then after the Second World War from 1946 to 1949. Heath's his final appearance for the county coming in 1962 against Nottinghamshire at Trent Bridge. In his 132 matches for the county, Heath scored 586 runs at a batting average of 5.58, with a high score of 34*. Heath, being a bowler, took 404 wickets at a bowling average of 28.11, with 23 five-wicket hauls and 2 ten wicket hauls in a match, with best bowling figures of 7/49 against Derbyshire in 1947. The 1938 season was Heath's best with the ball, during which he took 97 wickets at an average of 16.42, with 10 five wicket hauls and 3 ten wicket hauls in a match. In addition, Heath played an important role in Hampshire's 1961 County Championship winning squad, taking 63 wickets at an average of 23.77, with 5 five wicket hauls and best figures of 7-89. In his career, Heath took 49 catches in the field.

Heath died at Fareham, Hampshire on 6 March 1994.

External links
George Heath at Cricinfo
George Heath at CricketArchive
Matches and detailed statistics for George Heath

1913 births
1994 deaths
British people of Hong Kong descent
English cricketers
Hampshire cricketers
English cricket umpires